Sonic Boom is an album by jazz trumpeter Lee Morgan, recorded on April 14 and 28, 1967 but not released on the Blue Note label until 1979. The 2003 CD reissue added seven tracks recorded on September 12 & October 10, 1969 which were first released on the original double LP edition of The Procrastinator. Therefore, the CD edition includes performances by Morgan with two line-ups: the first one with tenor saxophonist David "Fathead" Newman, pianist Cedar Walton, bassist Ron Carter, and drummer Billy Higgins, whilst the second features trombonist Julian Priester, tenor saxophonist George Coleman, pianist Harold Mabern, bassist Walter Booker, and drummer Mickey Roker. The Sonic Boom session is notable for the rare contribution of David "Fathead" Newman, who made only two Blue Note appearances during his career, the other being with Lonnie Smith.

Reception
The Allmusic review by awarded the album 4½ stars stating "Despite the great differences in approach, these two sessions complement each other well; Morgan fans would be well advised to snag this one before Blue Note yanks it from the catalog once more.".

Track listing 
All compositions by Lee Morgan except where noted
 "Sneaky Pete" - 5:45
 "The Mercenary" - 7:10
 "Sonic Boom" - 6:18
 "Fathead" - 5:27
 "I'll Never Be the Same" (Malneck, Signorelli, Kahn) - 7:16
 "Mumbo Jumbo" - 5:29

2003 bonus tracks on CD reissue, originally part of The Procrastinator:
"Free Flow" (Coleman) - 4:50
 "Stormy Weather" (Arlen, Koehler) - 5:44
 "Mr. Johnson" (Mabern) - 6:11
 "The Stroker" (Priester) - 5:47
 "Uncle Rough" (Mabern) - 5:35
 "Claw-Til-Da" (Roker) - 3:07
 "Untitled Boogaloo" - 5:40

Recorded on April 14, 1967 (#3) and April 28, 1967 (#1-2, 4-6); September 12, 1969 (#8-9, 13) and October 10, 1969 (#7, 10-12).

Personnel 
Tracks 1-6
 Lee Morgan - trumpet
 David "Fathead" Newman - tenor sax
 Cedar Walton - piano
 Ron Carter - bass
 Billy Higgins - drums

Tracks 7-13
 Lee Morgan - trumpet
 Julian Priester - trombone
 George Coleman - tenor sax
 Harold Mabern - piano
 Walter Booker - bass
 Mickey Roker - drums

References 

Hard bop albums
Lee Morgan albums
1979 albums
Blue Note Records albums
Albums produced by Alfred Lion
Albums produced by Francis Wolff
Albums recorded at Van Gelder Studio